Check washing is the process of erasing details from checks to allow them to be rewritten, usually for criminal purposes such as fraudulent withdrawal from the victim's bank account.

Various steps can be taken by the writer of the check to reduce the possibility of falling victim to check washing. These include mailing checks by placing them in secured mailboxes, using secure ink dispensed from a gel, rollerball, or fountain pen, filling in all lines on the check, and careful scrutiny of bank statements.

The actual process of washing a check is relatively simple and can be accomplished with basic solvents. The actual solvent is largely irrelevant — more importantly, the polarity of the solvent must match the polarity of the dye in the ink. For example, an ink that is mostly made of a polar dye would require a polar solvent (e.g. acetone or isopropanol). Both nail polish remover (acetone) and rubbing alcohol (isopropanol) are able to pull most common inks away from paper in minutes. Similarly, a non-polar dye would require a non-polar solvent (e.g. toluene or a similar hydrocarbon).

See also
 Bank fraud
 Cheque fraud
 Identity theft

References 

Fraud
Washing